The FIL European Luge Championships 1972 took place in Königssee, West Germany for the second time after previously hosting the event in 1967. It also marked the first time the event took place a permanent artificially refrigerated track which opened in early 1969.

Men's singles

Women's singles

Men's doubles

Medal table

References
Men's doubles European champions
Men's singles European champions
Women's singles European champions

FIL European Luge Championships
1972 in luge
Luge in Germany
1972 in German sport